Martina Hingis was the defending champion, but did not compete this year.

First-seeded Mary Pierce won the title by defeating Arantxa Sánchez Vicario 6–1, 6–0 in the final and earned $166,000 first-prize money. She lost 12 games during the tournament, surpassing Chris Evert's record of 15 games conceded during her title win in 1985. It was the 1st title of the year for Pierce and the 14th of her career.

Seeds
The first eight seeds received a bye into the second round.

Draw

Finals

Top half

Section 1

Section 2

Bottom half

Section 3

Section 4

References

External links
 Main and Qualifying draws

Family Circle Cup
Charleston Open